WO1 Temenggong Datuk Kanang anak Langkau, SP, PGB, PGBK, PBS (Rt) (2 March 1945 – 3 January 2013) was a Malaysian hero and soldier from the Iban Dayak community in Sarawak. He was in the Royal Ranger Regiment and Regimental Sergeant Major of 8 Renjer (8th Rangers) of the Malaysian Army with his tag number of 901378. He was awarded the Panglima Gagah Berani and Seri Pahlawan Gagah Perkasa medals from the Yang di-Pertuan Agong, Sultan Ahmad Shah on 3 June 1981. He is the sole recipient of both the Seri Pahlawan Gagah Perkasa and Pingat Gagah Berani, and was the last living recipient of the Seri Pahlawan Gagah Perkasa.

Early life and military service
Kanang anak Langkau was born on 2 March 1945 in Julau, Sarawak. He entered military service with the British Army, as an Iban Tracker, attending Jungle Warfare School in Ulu Tiram in early 1962. Kanang was attached to the 42 Commando serving during the Brunei Revolt and during the Indonesia-Malaysia Confrontation. He later served with the Royal New Zealand Infantry Regiment. He was absorbed into the Sarawak Rangers which eventually became part of the Malaysian Rangers when Malaysia was proclaimed on 16 September 1963.

Kanang joined the Sarawak Rangers as an Iban tracker on 21 April 1962. (He was among those recruited by the late Bennett Jarrow). Sarawak Rangers was then part of the British Army and later absorbed into the Malaysian Army's Royal Ranger Regiment upon the formation of Malaysia on 16 September 1963 between the then Federation of Malaya, Singapore, Sabah (then North Borneo) and Sarawak with Singapore ceded later and Brunei opted not to join.

In an operation in the Korbu Forest Reserve at Fort Legap on 1 June 1979 whilst on a mission tracking the enemy, Sergeant Kanang's group came across a temporary enemy resting camp. Sergeant Kanang ak Langkau from the 8th Battalion Royal Rangers immediately launched an attack on that enemy camp, an enemy that far outnumbered the Kanang's group. In this fierce contact with the enemy, two of the Rangers were mortally wounded. Five of the enemy were killed and enemy equipment was captured. He was conferred the highest gallantry award, the "Pingat Gagah Berani" by his Majesty the King.

In an incident in Tanah Hitam, Perak on 8 February 1980 a soldier was killed. Kanang, leading a platoon, was sent to track the enemy down and eliminate them. For eleven days they tracked the enemy until they stumbled upon a much larger enemy force at Ladang Kinding, Sungei Siput, Perak.

Kanang was able to successfully track down the enemy. The enemy was able to use the ground to their advantage. The lay of the land at that time was an obstacle as they were in very difficult terrain. The enemy was adept at concealment, after the years they spent fighting the British and the Malayans before that. However, the Rangers managed to keep up with the enemy. Even as some of his men were disheartened, he kept their morale up by encouraging them.

11 days after the death of the soldier, he managed to track and identify the enemy's route of escape. On the evening of 19 February 1980 at around 1500, after conducting a reconnaissance, his platoon managed to estimate the location of the enemy, which was located near their location.

Actually, they were inside the location of the enemy, as they were at the foot of the hill. They only realized that they were inside the enemy's location when they found a communication cord from the enemy sentry's location. This cord was running from the sentry's location to the enemy's main force. This cord is normally attached to a small bush or empty cans which make noise when pulled. This way the main force can be alerted by the sentry when an enemy approaches.

At that moment, Sergeant Kanang was approximately 8 meters from the enemy sentry's location. Realizing that, he launched an assault towards the right by firing towards the right of the enemy with his platoon. After launching the attack, they realised that the enemy's main force was on the left, below the slope of the hill. Without losing his senses, he switched the direction of the assault to the left.

They ploughed through the enemy but a large force of the enemy managed to escape. The platoon and Kanang managed to capture five Communist Terrorists on that day. Even with that success, they were saddened by the loss of one of their group who was killed and one more seriously wounded. Whilst trying to rescue his wounded friends, Sergeant Kanang was repeatedly shot, he took three rounds from the enemy into his body. He was in a coma for two months in the hospital but recuperated and was back on active duty.

Honors

For his service, Kanang was awarded the nation's two highest awards Sri Pahlawan Perkasa (SP) and the Panglima Gagah Berani (PGB) by His Majesty the King Yang Di-Pertuan Agong Sultan Ahmad Shah in June 1981.

He retired as Warrant Officer One (WOI) after serving the army for more than 21 years.

A book entitled Kanang, The Story of a Hero was written about his military service and used as a literature text book in the Malaysian national secondary school.

Retirement and recognition
Kanang retired after 21 years of service as a First Warrant Officer. He was the Temenggong (paramount chief) of the Iban in Sri Aman, his place of residence. He was awarded the Officer of the Most Exalted Order of the Star of Sarawak (PBS) (Malay: Pegawai Bintang Sarawak) in 1987.

Malaysia's most decorated war hero Kanang Anak Langkau could have died as a pauper as his military services – helping to liberate Malaya (and later Malaysia) from the communists were not respected as a hero should be until he and few other war heroes made noise complaining that they had been treated shabbily both by the Federal Government and Sarawak State Government.

Their contributions were not financially recognized – not even a sen and their welfare were not taken care of, as compared to financial rewards and other perks given to communist terrorists who surrendered.

There were six holders of Sri Pahlawan (SP) Gagah Perkasa (the Gallantry Award) from Sarawak, and with the death of Kanang Anak Langkau, there is one SP holder in the person of Sgt. Ngalinuh (an Orang Ulu).

The heroes were 21 holders of Panglima Gagah Berani (PGB) with 16 survivors. Of the total, there are fourteen (14) Ibans, one Bidayuh, one Kayan, one Malay and two Chinese army officers. But the majorities in the Armed Forces are Malays, according to a book – Crimson Tide over Borneo. The youngest of the PGB holder is ASP Wilfred Gomez of the Police Force.

Kanang Anak Langkau was the holder of both the SP and PGB. Their contributions were initially not rewarded, not even a sen except they received pensions like other retired civil servants.

The heroes were not even invited to attend national day celebrations.

Angered by the ill-treatment, Kanang even refused the title of Datuk offered to him saying he was a poor man and could not afford to receive this title.

Their woes got the attention of Jawah Gerang, the Member of Parliament (MP) for Lubok Antu in Sarawak who raised the issue in Parliament some time in the 1980s. Approved by the government, a PGB holder was given a monthly allowance of RM300 and a SP holder RM400.

In 2006, a delegation of the heroes from Sarawak met with the Defence Minister Najib Razak and appealed to increase their monthly allowances by RM700.

Instead of accepting their recommendation, Najib who was also the Deputy Prime Minister decided to more than double the increase of the allowance by RM1,600. The issue was brought to Parliament and approved. Thus, a SP holder receives RM2,000 a month, while a PGB holder receives RM1,900 a month.

Promotionwise, only on 1 November 2010, an Iban Officer by the name of Stephen Mundaw was promoted to a Brigadier-General. He was the first Iban to become a General in the Malaysian Army since Sarawak became independent on 22 July 1963 from the British and forming The Federation of Malaysia on 16 September 1963 along with North Borneo (Sabah now) and Singapore which was ceded later. If you want to look further; he was the first Iban General in the long history of the Malaysian Rangers when its predecessor the Sarawak Rangers was formed by Rajah Charles Brooke in 1862. With this promotion, inadvertently, "an Iban allocation" might have been created in the Malaysian Army.

For his knowledge in Iban traditions and customs, Kanang was later made a Temenggong for the Iban community of Sri Aman division and last year he was conferred a Datukship by the state government.

On 15 April 2009, he made headlines after rescuing a baby orangutan from captivity with his friend, Tay Choon Yong. The baby orangutan was being handed to Semenggoh Wildlife Centre.

On 24 September 2011, he was conferred the Commander of the Order of the Star of Hornbill Sarawak (PGBK) (Panglima Gemilang Bintang Kenyalang), with the title of Datuk by the Abang Muhammad Salahuddin, the Head of State's 90th Birthday.

In 2011, Kanang supervised Operation Mai Pulai.  This operation involved the locating and exhumation of the remains of 21 Iban Trackers and Sarawak Rangers who were killed during the Second Malayan Emergency. Their remains were exhumed from multiple location on the Malay Peninsula and returned to Sarawak where they were ceremonially reburied in July 2011.

Death and Funeral

On 3 January 2013, he collapsed while watching television at home in Sungai Apong, Sri Aman after complaining of chest pains. Immediately rushed to the Sarawak General Hospital, he was pronounced dead at the age of 67.

He was buried on 6 January with full military honours at the Heroes' Grave at Jalan Budaya, Kuching.

Meanwhile, messages of condolences and sympathy have been received by the family of the late Kanang from government leaders including from the Malaysian Prime Minister Najib Tun Razak and Sarawak Chief Minister Abdul Taib Mahmud.

According to the Minister of Defence, Datuk Seri Ahmad Zahid Hamidi, he will be given a national burial. His coffin, draped in the Jalur Gemilang and the colours of the Malaysian Armed Forces, was first brought to the 1st Infantry Division base located at Bukavu Camp in Penrissen for the family members and friends to perform prayers and miring ceremony (offering ceremony), before being brought to Kuching Civic Centre for the public to pay their last respects. He was buried at the Heroes' Grave in Jalan Taman Budaya, after the funeral prayers at St.Thomas Cathedral in Kuching.

Among Ibans, Kanang's acts in the military service is regarded as "raja berani tau serang" which is commensurate with the highest widower fee for Great War Leader. Otherwise, his temenggong chieftain title entitled him for the fifth widower fee.

Honours and awards
Military honours and awards
 Seri Pahlawan Gagah Perkasa (SP) (Supreme Gallantry Award)
 Panglima Gagah Berani (PGB) (Star of the Commander of Valour)
 Pingat Perkhidmatan Am (PPA) (Federation General Service Medal)
 Pingat Perkhidmatan Setia (Federation Loyal Service Medal)
 Pingat Jasa Malaysia (Malaysia Service Medal) 
 General Service Medal (1918) (United Kingdom) with "Brunei" clasp (for the participation in Brunei Revolt)
 General Service Medal (1962) (United Kingdom) with "Borneo" clasp (for the participation in Indonesia-Malaysia Confrontation)

State honours and awards
 Panglima Gemilang Bintang Kenyalang (PGBK) (Commander of the Star of the Hornbill of Sarawak) (2011)
 Pegawai Bintang Sarawak (PBS) (Most Exalted Order of the Star of Sarawak-Officer) (1987)

Legacy 
A Malay language novel used in secondary schools in Malaysia called Kanang, Cerita Seorang Pahlawan ("Kanang, The Hero's Story"), written by Mazlan Nordin, is a story about Kanang anak Langkau.

In popular culture 
 Kanang Anak Langkau: The Iban Warrior- 2017 Malaysian movie directed by Bade Haji Azmi and starring by Langgi Kanang (son of Kanang who serve Malaysian Army).

See also
Communist insurgency in Malaysia (1968–89)

References

Adopted from the Malaysian secondary school, Form 3 History textbook: "Kanang, Cerita Seorang Pahlawan" by Mazlan Nordin (1989)

External links
Portrait of WO(1) Kanang anak Langkau in Military Ceremonial Attire
Kanang anak Langkau with his military medals
Kanang anak Langkau photos

Malaysian military personnel
1945 births
2013 deaths
Iban people
Recipients of the Grand Knight of Valour
Malaysian Anglicans
Recipients of the Star of the Commander of Valour
Commanders of the Order of the Star of Hornbill Sarawak
People from Sarawak